The New Brunswick Railway Museum, owned and operated by the Canadian Railroad Historical Association, New Brunswick Division,  is a museum located in Hillsborough, New Brunswick consisting of the railway's line last remaining steam engine. It was formerly known as the Salem and Hillsborough Railroad (S&H) before the rails were superseded by Highway 114.

The Salem and Hillsborough Railroad was formed in 1982 by a group of volunteer railroad enthusiasts and retired railroad employees. CN had operated this subdivision to service a gypsum quarry until the late 1970s when the quarry was closed, resulting in the company applying for abandonment. The first trial trains operated in 1983, and the line opened to the public in 1984.

The S&H initially operated historic CN and Canadian Pacific steam locomotives 29 and 1009, which had been used in New Brunswick until the early 1960s when both railways completely dieselized.  The S&H operated regular coach and dinner tourist trains between Hillsborough and a location halfway between Hillsborough and Salisbury, named Salem, from 1984 until 2004.

On 16 September 1994, a fire occurred which destroyed the yardhouse and several engines and carriages within, as well as offices and historical records.

Since 2005 the site became a static museum as the New Brunswick Railway Museum, using the former excursion train as a centerpoint.

See also
List of heritage railways in Canada
 List of museums in Canada

References

External links 
New Brunswick Railway Museum

Heritage railways in New Brunswick
Railway museums in New Brunswick
Transport in Albert County, New Brunswick
History museums in New Brunswick
Tourist attractions in Albert County, New Brunswick
Buildings and structures in Albert County, New Brunswick
Buildings and structures in Canada destroyed by arson